NMB Bank Limited, previously known as National Merchant Bank of Zimbabwe Limited, is a commercial bank in Zimbabwe. It is licensed by the Reserve Bank of Zimbabwe, the central bank of that country and the national banking regulator.

Location
The headquarters of this bank and its main branch, are located on the First Floor of Unity Court, at the corner of Kwame Nkrumah Avenue and First Street, in Harare, the capital and largest city of Zimbabwe. The geographical coordinates of the headquarters of NMB Bank Limited are:17°49'40.0"S, 31°02'56.0"E (Latitude:-17.827778; Longitude:31.048889).

Overview
The bank is a medium-sized financial services institution, that serves large corporations, small to medium enterprises (SMEs), as well as individuals. , the bank's total assets were valued at US$422.6 million, with shareholders' equity valued at US$65.65 million.

History
NMB Bank Limited was founded in 1993 by Zimbweans. At that time it was under the name National Merchant Bank of Zimbabwe. In June 1993, the bank was registered as an accepting house under the Banking Act. In 1997, the NMBZ Group was listed on the Zimbabwe Stock Exchange and simultaneously on the London Stock Exchange. In December 1999, NMB Bank was granted a commercial banking licence. It commenced commercial banking services in July 2000.

In 2013, FMO, Norfund and  AfricInvest, jointly invested US$14.8 million in NMB Holdings Limited, the parent company of NMB Bank, for a collective shareholding of 27 percent.

Ownership
The bank is a 100% subsidiary of NMBZ Holdings Limited (NMBZ), a Zimbabwean investment and holding company. NMB Bank Limited is the principal subsidiary of NMBZ. The stock of the holding company is listed on the Zimbabwe Stock Exchange and on the London Stock Exchange. As of December 2017, the shareholding in the stock of the holding company is as illustrated in the table below:

Note:Arise BV is a special purpose vehicle company, formed in 2016 and co-owned by Norfund, FMO and Rabobank. Arise invests in African financial institutions.

Branch network
, the bank maintained a network of 14 branches.

See also
List of banks in Zimbabwe
Reserve Bank of Zimbabwe
Economy of Zimbabwe

References

Banks of Zimbabwe
Banks established in 1993
1993 establishments in Zimbabwe
Companies listed on the Zimbabwe Stock Exchange
Companies listed on the London Stock Exchange